Clube Ferroviário da Beira (in English: Railway Club Beira) is a basketball club from Beira, Mozambique. The team plays in the national Mozambican Basketball League and has won the national championship three times.

The team played in the Basketball Africa League (BAL) in the 2022 season.

History
Founded in 1924, Ferroviário da Beira has played in the Mozambican Basketball League for most of its existence. From 2012, the team won three consecutive league championships.

Ferroviário team played in the 2018–19 Africa Basketball League. In the fall of 2021, they played in the qualifiers of the Basketball Africa League (BAL) for the first time. On December 10, 2021, the team qualified for the 2022 BAL season after defeating Cape Town Tigers in the semi-finals. In its debut season in the BAL, Beira finished in the fifth place in the Sahara Conference with a 1–4 record. On 8 March 2022, the team won its first game in the league after defeating hosts DUC 98–92.

In 2022 and 2023, Beira won its fourth and fifth national championship, behind league MVP Will Perry.

Honours
Mozambique Division 1
Winners (4): 2012, 2013, 2014, 2022
Runners-up (2): 2009, 2016

Players

Current roster

In African competitions
Basketball Africa League (BAL) (1 appearance)

 2022 – Group Phase
BAL Qualifiers (1 appearance)

 2021 – Winners of East Division
 2022 – In progress

FIBA Africa Club Champions Cup (4 appearances)

 2007 – 12th place
 2013 – 10th place
 2017 – 6th place
 2019 – Group Stage

References

External links
Official website (in Portuguese)

Basketball Africa League teams
Beira, Mozambique
Basketball teams established in 1924
Basketball teams in Mozambique
1924 establishments in Mozambique

Road to BAL teams